Face It Live '97 is a live album by John Norum, the guitarist in the Swedish hard rock band Europe. It was released in 1997.

Track listing
"Face the Truth" – 5:17 (John Norum, Glenn Hughes)
"Night Buzz" – 3:42 (Norum, Henrik Hildén, Michelle Meldrum)
"Make a Move" – 4:52 (Norum, Kelly Keeling, Alan Lorber)
"Good Man Shining" – 3:08 (Hughes, Norum, Mats Attaque, Micke Höglund, Thomas Broman)
"Wishing Well" – 4:34 (Paul Rodgers, Paul Kossoff, Simon Kirke, Tetsu Yamauchi, John Bundrick)
"Where the Grass is Green" – 3:53 (Norum, Keeling)
"Resurrection Time" – 5:08 (Norum, Keeling, Lorber)
"Opium Trail" – 5:21 (Brian Downey, Phil Lynott, Scott Gorham)
"In Your Eyes" – 4:33 (Hughes, Norum, Peter Baltes)
"Blind" – 3:57 (Norum, Marcel Jacob)
"C.Y.R." – 5:22 (Norum, Keeling, Simon Wright)
Guitar Solo – 3:43 (Norum)
"Heart of Stone" – 3:37 (Joey Tempest)
"From Outside In" – 6:12 (Baltes, Norum, Keeling)
"Let Me Love You" – 5:18 (Norum, Jacob)
"Scream of Anger" – 5:01 (Tempest, Jacob)

Personnel 
John Norum – Guitars, vocals
Leif Sundin – Lead vocals, guitars
Anders Fästader – Bass, keyboards, backing vocals
Henrik Hildén – Drums

Album credits 
John Norum - Producer

John Norum albums
1997 live albums